Tibor Gašpar (born 23 April 1962) was the President of police of Slovakia. He assumed office in 2012.

Early life
Gašpar was born in Kežmarok, then Czechoslovakia. He attended Comenius University (Slovak: Univerzita Komenského) from 1982 until he graduated in 1987.

President of Police
Gašpar assumed office on 15 May 2012. Over his tenure he has led many high-level investigations, including investigations into corruption and theft within the Government of Slovakia. In February 2018, Gašpar and the Slovak Police came under international media attention after the murder of journalist Ján Kuciak.  Gašpar announced that his killing was likely to "have something to do with [Kuciak’s] investigative activities". At the time of his murder, Kuciak was working on a report about the Slovak connections of the 'Ndrangheta. The National Police and Government offered €1 million for information leading to the arrest of the murderers. Gaspar resigned in April 2018

See also
 List of presidents of the Slovak Police Force
 Slovak Police Force
 Murder of Ján Kuciak

References

1962 births
Living people
Slovak police officers
People from Kežmarok
Comenius University alumni
Chiefs of police